Kopi may refer to:

 An alternative name for the karaka tree
 Kopi, a clay mourning cap worn by some Aboriginal Australian peoples
 Kopi (drink), a coffee beverage with Hainanese cultural roots popular in Maritime Southeast Asia 
 Kopi tiam, a coffee shop or restaurant in Southeast Asia which serves kopi as a menu item
Coffee in Indonesia 
 Kopi luwak, a specially processed coffee made in Indonesia and the Philippines which typically involve civet cats
 Kopi tubruk, an Indonesian brewed coffee beverage served black 
 Kopi arabika

See also 

Köpi, König Pilsener beer
Køpi housing project in Berlin